Zarrineh Rud Rural District is in Baktash District of Miandoab County, West Azerbaijan province, Iran. At the National Census of 2006, its population was 15,077 in 3,575 households, when it was in the Central District. There were 17,689 inhabitants in 4,983 households at the following census of 2011. At the most recent census of 2016, the population of the rural district was 17,756 in 5,426 households. The largest of its 22 villages was Bagtash, with 3,523 people. After the census, the rural district was elevated to the status of Baktash District and divided into two rural districts.

References 

Miandoab County

Rural Districts of West Azerbaijan Province

Populated places in West Azerbaijan Province

Populated places in Miandoab County